Polystira tellea is a species of sea snail, a marine gastropod mollusc in the family Turridae, the turrids.

Description
This form differs from the Polystira albida in having the revolving sculpture fainter and more uniform, the transverse sculpture much stronger and more elevated, giving a finely reticulated appearance to the surface. The anal notch is more shallow, the siphonal canal more slender, usually without any umbilical chink.

Distribution
P. tellea can be found in the Gulf of Mexico, ranging from Texas to western Florida.; also off French Guiana, Suriname and Colombia.
.

References

 Takeda, M. & Okutani, T. Crustaceans and Mollusks Trawled off Suriname and French Guiana. Tokio: Japan Marine Fishery Resource Research Center, 353 p., 1983. 
  Rosenberg, G.; Moretzsohn, F.; García, E. F. (2009). Gastropoda (Mollusca) of the Gulf of Mexico, Pp. 579–699 in: Felder, D.L. and D.K. Camp (eds.), Gulf of Mexico–Origins, Waters, and Biota. Texas A&M Press, College Station, Texas.

External links
  Todd J.A. & Rawlings T.A. (2014). A review of the Polystira clade — the Neotropic's largest marine gastropod radiation (Neogastropoda: Conoidea: Turridae sensu stricto). Zootaxa. 3884(5): 445-491

tellea
Gastropods described in 1889